The Little River is a  tributary of the Ossipee River in the U.S. state of Maine. Via the Ossipee River, it is part of the Saco River watershed, flowing to the Atlantic Ocean.  The Little River flows entirely within the town of Cornish.

See also
List of rivers of Maine

References

Maine Streamflow Data from the USGS
Maine Watershed Data From Environmental Protection Agency

Rivers of Maine
Saco River
Rivers of York County, Maine